Boz-Karagan is a village in Osh Region of Kyrgyzstan. Its population was 1,477 in 2021.

The town of Gülchö is 2.1 miles (3.4 km) to the east, and Arpa-Tektir is 2 miles (3 km) to the north.

References

External links 
Satellite map at Maplandia.com

Populated places in Osh Region